Antonio Núñez may refer to:

Antonio Núñez Tena (born 1979), Spanish footballer
Antonio Núñez Jiménez (1923–1998), Cuban scholar and politician

See also
António Nunes Ribeiro Sanches (1699–1783), Portuguese encyclopédiste
Antonio Escobar Núñez (born 1976), Spanish musician